Membership of the European Molecular Biology Organization (EMBO)  is an award granted by the European Molecular Biology Organization (EMBO) in recognition of "research excellence and the outstanding achievements made by a life scientist".

, 88 EMBO Members and Associate Members have been awarded Nobel Prizes in either Physiology or Medicine, Chemistry or Physics. See :Category:Members of the European Molecular Biology Organization for examples of EMBO members.

Nomination and election of new members
Elections for membership are held annually with candidates for membership being nominated and elected exclusively by existing EMBO members, membership cannot be applied for directly. Three types of membership exist:

 EMBO Member, for scientists living (or who have lived) in a European Molecular Biology Conference (EMBC) Member State
 EMBO Associate Member, for scientists living outside of the EMBC Member States
 EMBO Young Investigator

See also

 List of biology awards

References

Biology awards
European Molecular Biology Organization
Molecular biology